The men's 200 metre butterfly event at the 2008 Olympic Games took place on 11–13 August at the Beijing National Aquatics Center in Beijing, China.

U.S. swimmer Michael Phelps blasted a new world record of 1:52.03 to defend his title in the event, and more importantly, claim his fourth Olympic gold, tenth career, and twelfth overall medal. During the final, Phelps' goggles filled with water, which prevented him from seeing anything, while he was finishing the second lap.

Hungary's László Cseh added a second silver to his hardware from the 400 m individual medley, breaking a European record of 1:52.70. Japan's Takeshi Matsuda powered home with a bronze medal in 1:52.97.

New Zealand's Moss Burmester shared a fourth place with host nation China's Wu Peng in 1:54.35, while Poland's Paweł Korzeniowski finished sixth with a time of 1:54.60. Brazil's Kaio de Almeida (1:54.71) and Russia's Nikolay Skvortsov (1:55.14) rounded out the finale.

Earlier in the semifinals, Phelps registered his own Olympic record of 1:53.70 to establish a strong lead for the top 8 final, matching his preliminary time in the process.

Records
Prior to this competition, the existing world and Olympic records were as follows.

The following new world and Olympic records were set during this competition.

Results

Heats

Semifinals

Semifinal 1

Semifinal 2

Final

References

External links
Official Reports

Swimming at the 2008 Summer Olympics
Men's events at the 2008 Summer Olympics